In inorganic chemistry, bicarbonate (IUPAC-recommended nomenclature: hydrogencarbonate) is an intermediate form in the deprotonation of carbonic acid. It is a polyatomic anion with the chemical formula .

Bicarbonate serves a crucial biochemical role in the physiological pH buffering system.

The term "bicarbonate" was coined in 1814 by the English chemist William Hyde Wollaston. The name lives on as a trivial name.

Chemical properties

The bicarbonate ion (hydrogencarbonate ion) is an anion with the empirical formula  and a molecular mass of 61.01 daltons; it consists of one central carbon atom surrounded by three oxygen atoms in a trigonal planar arrangement, with a hydrogen atom attached to one of the oxygens. It is isoelectronic with nitric acid . The bicarbonate ion carries a negative one formal charge and is an amphiprotic species which has both acidic and basic properties.

 + 2 H2O   + H2O + OH−  H2CO3 + 2  OH−

H2CO3 + 2 H2O   + H3O+ + H2O   + 2 H3O+.

A bicarbonate salt forms when a positively charged ion attaches to the negatively charged oxygen atoms of the ion, forming an ionic compound. Many bicarbonates are soluble in water at standard temperature and pressure; in particular, sodium bicarbonate contributes to total dissolved solids, a common parameter for assessing water quality.

Physiological role

With carbonic acid as the central intermediate species, bicarbonate – in conjunction with water, hydrogen ions, and carbon dioxide – forms this buffering system, which is maintained at the volatile equilibrium required to provide prompt resistance to pH changes in both the acidic and basic directions. This is especially important for protecting tissues of the central nervous system, where pH changes too far outside of the normal range in either direction could prove disastrous (see acidosis or alkalosis). Recently it has been also demonstrated that cellular bicarbonate metabolism can be regulated by mTORC1 signaling.
 
Additionally, bicarbonate plays a key role in the digestive system. It raises the internal pH of the stomach, after highly acidic digestive juices have finished in their digestion of food. Bicarbonate also acts to regulate pH in the small intestine. It is released from the pancreas in response to the hormone secretin to neutralize the acidic chyme entering the duodenum from the stomach.

Bicarbonate in the environment
Bicarbonate is the dominant form of dissolved inorganic carbon in sea water, and in most fresh waters. As such it is an important sink in the carbon cycle.

In freshwater ecology, strong photosynthetic activity by freshwater plants in daylight releases gaseous oxygen into the water and at the same time produces bicarbonate ions. These shift the pH upward until in certain circumstances the degree of alkalinity can become toxic to some organisms or can make other chemical constituents such as ammonia toxic. In darkness, when no photosynthesis occurs, respiration processes release carbon dioxide, and no new bicarbonate ions are produced, resulting in a rapid fall in pH.

The flow of bicarbonate ions from rocks weathered by the carbonic acid in rainwater is an important part of the carbon cycle.

Other uses
The most common salt of the bicarbonate ion is sodium bicarbonate, NaHCO3, which is commonly known as baking soda. When heated or exposed to an acid such as acetic acid (vinegar), sodium bicarbonate releases carbon dioxide. This is used as a leavening agent in baking.

Ammonium bicarbonate is used in digestive biscuit manufacture.

Diagnostics
In diagnostic medicine, the blood value of bicarbonate is one of several indicators of the state of acid–base physiology in the body. It is measured, along with carbon dioxide, chloride, potassium, and sodium, to assess electrolyte levels in an electrolyte panel test (which has Current Procedural Terminology, CPT, code 80051).

Bicarbonate compounds 

 Sodium bicarbonate
 Potassium bicarbonate
 Caesium bicarbonate
 Magnesium bicarbonate
 Calcium bicarbonate
 Ammonium bicarbonate
 Carbonic acid

See also

 Carbon dioxide
 Carbonate
 Carbonic anhydrase
 Hard water
 Arterial blood gas test

References

External links

 

Amphoteric compounds
Anions